Sarah Greene (born 1957) is an English television personality. Other people with this name include:

Sarah Greene (actress) (born 1984), Irish actor and singer
Sarah Pratt McLean Greene (1856–1935), American writer

See also
Sarah Green (disambiguation)